Thermal treatment is any waste treatment technology that involves high temperatures in the processing of the waste feedstock. Commonly this involves the combustion of waste materials.

Systems that are generally considered to be thermal treatment include:

Cement kiln
Gasification
Incineration
Mechanical heat treatment
Pyrolysis
Thermal depolymerization
Waste autoclaves

See also
Anaerobic digestion
List of solid waste treatment technologies
Mechanical biological treatment
Waste-to-energy
Pyrolysis

 
Waste management
Waste treatment technology